Rune Gustavsson  (1920–2002) was a Swedish politician. He was a member of the Centre Party. Gustavsson was a member of parliament from 1958 to 1986, and was Minister for Social Affairs from 1976 to 1978, in the Fälldin I Cabinet.

References

This article was initially translated from the Swedish Wikipedia article.

Swedish Ministers for Social Affairs
1920 births
2002 deaths

Members of the Riksdag from the Centre Party (Sweden)
20th-century Swedish politicians